Albapomecyna is a genus of beetle in the family Cerambycidae. Its sole species is Albapomecyna alboplagiata. It was described by Stephan von Breuning in 1980.

References

Pteropliini
Beetles described in 1980